Tops or TOPS may refer to:

Tops
 Tops (band), a band from Montreal, Quebec
 Tops Friendly Markets, an American supermarket chain
 Tops Supermarket, a Thai supermarket chain
 Tops Pizza, a British restaurant chain
 "Tops", a Rolling Stones song on their album Tattoo You
 Jan Tops (born 1961), a Dutch equestrian

TOPS
TOPS, Total Operations Processing System, a railroad stock management system
TOPS (file server), a file-sharing system for the Macintosh and IBM PC
TOPS (Nortel), Traffic Operator Position System, a computer-based operator switchboard
TOPS Club, a non-profit weight-management organization in the United States
 TOPS Program (Talented Offerings for Programs in the Sciences), a program at Marc Garneau Collegiate Institute, Toronto, Canada
TOPS-10, a Digital Equipment Corporation PDP-10 operating system
TOPS-20, a Digital Equipment Corporation PDP-10 operating system
Traffic Operations Practitioner Specialist, a non-professional certification for transportation engineers
Taylor Opportunity Program for Students, a scholarship program in Louisiana
Thermoelectric Outer Planets Spacecraft, a proposed vehicle to carry out the Planetary Grand Tour
Team Oriented Problem Solving, one of Ford's Eight disciplines problem solving

Topps
Topps, a manufacturer of candy and collectibles
Topps Meat Company, a producer of ground beef patties
Topps Tiles, a British retailer that sells floor tiles and related products

See also
 TeraOPS (trillions of operations per second); see High Performance Storage System
 Top (disambiguation)
 Topper (disambiguation)
 Topping (disambiguation)